The Mitra dynasty refers to a group of local rulers whose name incorporated the suffix "-mitra" and who are thought to have ruled in the area of Mathura from around 150 BCE to 50 BCE, at the time of Indo-Greek hegemony over the region, and possibly in a tributary relationship with them.  They are not known to have been satraps nor kings, and their coins only bear their name without any title, therefore they are sometimes simply called "the Mitra rulers of Mathura". Alternatively, they have been dated from 100 BCE to 20 BCE. The Mitra dynasty was replaced by the Indo-Scythian Northern Satraps from around 60 BCE.

Some sources consider that the Mitra dynasty ruled at a later date, during the 1st or 2nd century CE, and that they ruled from Mathura to Saketa, where they replaced the Deva dynasty.

In addition to the Mitra dynasties of Saketa (Kosala kingdom) and Mathura, there were Mitra dynasties in Ahichchhatra (Panchala kingdom) and Kaushambi (Vatsa kingdom). During the 1st century BCE to 2nd century CE, the Mitras of Kaushambi also appear to have extended their hegemony over Magadha (including Pataliputra), and possibly Kannauj as well.

The dynasty
Seven rulers of Mathura are known:
 Gomitra
 Gomitra II
 Brahmamitra
 Dridhamitra
 Suryamitra
 Vishnumitra
 Satyamitra

These rulers are never mentioned as "Kings" or Raja on their coins: there is therefore a possibly that they may only have been local rulers and vassals to larger king. Gomitra II and Brahmamitra especially are known for their large number of coins, which is not so much the case for other rulers.

In the archaeological excavations of Sonkh, near Mathura, archaeological levels of the Mitra rulers were identified.

Coins of the Mitra dynasty were found in Sonkh especially, in layers dated to about 150–50 BCE. The earliest Mitra coins are those of Gomitra (150–50 BCE).

Relation with the Indo-Greeks

From numismatic, literary and epigraphic evidence, it seems that the Indo-Greeks had control over Mathura at some time, especially during the rule of Menander I (165–135 BCE). The control of Mathura seems to have continued for some time under the successors of Menander, with Strato I, Antimachus and Apollodotus II, where they were facing the territory of the Sungas.  Coins of Menander and Strato can be found in the area of Mathura, and Ptolemy records Menander as having ruled as far as Mathura (Μόδουρα) in Book VII, I, 47 of his Geographia.  An inscription in Mathura discovered in 1988 mentions "The last day of year 116 of Yavana hegemony (Yavanarajya)", also attesting presence of the Indo-Greeks in the 2nd century BCE. The inscription would date to the 116th year of the Yavana era (thought to start in 186–185 BCE) which would give it a date of 70 or 69 BCE. The Yavanarajya inscription reads:

The Indo-Greeks may have been supplanted by Indo-Scythians around that date, who would then rule in Mathura as the Northern Satraps.

From this time also (circa 150 BCE), archaeological research at Mathura reports an important growth of the city and extensive building of fortifications. Stone sculptures in Mathura are also known from this period onwards, although Indo-Greek artistic influence cannot be readily seen.

Given the suggestions of Greek presence and control concomitantly with the rule of the Mitra dynasty in the same time frame (150–50 BCE), it is therefore thought that there may have been a sort of tributary relationship between the Mitra dynasty and the Indo-Greeks to the west. Numerous coins of Rajuvula have been found in company with the coins of the Strato group in the Eastern Punjab (to the east of the Jhelum) and also in the Mathura area.

Shungas to the east

The period in which the Mitra dynasty ruled in Mathura roughly corresponds to the Hindu Sunga dynasty (180 BCE–80 BCE); however, it doesn't seem that the Shungas ruled in Mathura or  Surasena since no Shunga coins or inscriptions have been found there.

The Mitra dynasty was replaced by the Indo-Scythian Northern Satraps around 60 BCE.

"Datta" rulers of Mathura

Another dynasty of local rulers, named the "Datta kings" is also known to have ruled in Mathura. These rulers are known as Seshadatta, Ramadatta, Sisuchandradatta and Sivadatta. The coins of Ramadatta usually represent a Lakshmi standing, and facing elephants. It is thought that they came just before, and were replaced by the Mitra dynasty.

References

Mathura
Indian royalty
Dynasties of India